Orlacher Bach is a stream in Baden-Württemberg, Germany. It is named for the small village of Orlach, which sits high above it. The stream begins about a kilometer WSW of the village of Nesselbach.

Extreme weather led to the stream's overflowing its banks on May 29, 2016, contributing to considerable damage to the town of Braunsbach.

References

Rivers of Baden-Württemberg
Rivers of Germany